The Badger Creek Wilderness is a  wilderness area located east of Mount Hood in the northwestern Cascades of Oregon, United States.  It is one of six designated wilderness areas in the Mount Hood National Forest, the others being Mark O. Hatfield, Salmon-Huckleberry, Mount Hood, Mount Jefferson, and Bull of the Woods.

Topography

Three creeks drain the Wilderness - Badger, Little Badger, and Tygh.

Vegetation

Lookout Mountain and the high ridgeland extending east support a subalpine ecosystem, with hardy trees and rocky terrain.  Penstemon, Indian paintbrush, yellow avalanche lilies, and stonecrop are common in the area.  Farther east in the Wilderness the climate is warm and dry, where ponderosa pine forest and extensive growths of Oregon white oak and grasslands are common.  Larkspur, shooting star, lupine, balsamroot, death camas, and purple onion can be found in the area.

Recreation
Common recreational activities in Badger Creek Wilderness include hiking, camping, wildlife watching, cross-country skiing, and horseback riding. These trails lead to Lookout Mountain, Flag Point fire lookout, Badger Lake, and along Badger, Little Badger, and Tygh Creeks. There are several primitive campsites in the wilderness. the Bonney Butte area of the wilderness is in Mount Hood National Recreation Area.

See also 
 List of Oregon Wildernesses
 List of U.S. Wilderness Areas
 Old growth
 List of old growth forests
 Wilderness Act

References

External links

 Mt. Hood National Forest - Wilderness

Cascade Range
Old-growth forests
Wilderness areas of Oregon
Protected areas of Hood River County, Oregon
Protected areas of Wasco County, Oregon
Mount Hood National Forest
1984 establishments in Oregon
Protected areas established in 1984